A persona non grata is a foreign person whose entering or remaining in a particular country is prohibited by that country's government.

Persona Non Grata may also refer to:
 Persona Non Grata (2003 film), a documentary film
 Persona Non Grata (2005 film), a Polish drama film
 Persona Non Grata (2015 film), a Japanese biographical drama film
 , a French remake of the 2002 Brazilian thriller film O Invasor
 Persona Non Grata (Urban Dance Squad album), an album by Urban Dance Squad
Persona Non Grata (album), an album by Authority Zero
 Persona Non Grata (Exodus album), an album by Exodus
 "Persona Non Grata," the 13th and final episode of the fourth season of The Americans 
 "Persona Non Grata", the title of the fourth mission of video game Call of Duty: Modern Warfare 3.